Closed-circuit television is a remote monitoring system using cameras.

CCTV may also refer to:

 China Central Television, the state national television broadcaster in mainland China
 Cork Community TV, a community television station in Cork, Ireland
 Cambridge Community Television, a public access television service in Cambridge, Massachusetts, US

See also

 CTV (disambiguation)
 CCT (disambiguation)
 
 CC (disambiguation)